This is a list of lighthouses and lightvessels in Sweden.

Lightvessels 
Almagrundet
Old Finngrundet lightvessel, now a museum ship
Fladen

Lighthouses 
Agö, Hälsingland
Bergudden, Västerbotten
Bjuröklubb, Västerbotten
Brämön, Ångermanland
Bönan, Gästrikland
Djursten, Uppland
Eggegrund, Gästrikland
Falsterbo Lighthouse, Skåne
Falsterborev, Skåne
Faludden, Gotland
Finngrundet, Uppland
Fårö Lighthouse, Gotland
Garpen, Småland
Gotska Sandön, Gotland
Grundkallen, Uppland
Grönskär, Södermanland
Gåsören, Västerbotten
Hallands Väderö, Skåne
Hanö, Blekinge
Hoburgen, Gotland
Holmögadd, Ångermanland
Huvudskär, Södermanland
Hållö, Bohuslän
Häradskär, Östergötland
Hätteberget, Bohuslän
Högbonden, Ångermanland
Högby Lighthouse, Öland
Kapelludden, Öland
Kullen Lighthouse, Kullaberg, Skåne
Landsort, Södermanland
Lungö, Ångermanland
Långe Erik, Öland
Långe Jan, Öland
Malören, Norrbotten
Morups Tånge, Halland
Måseskär, Bohuslän
Naven, Vänern
Nidingen, Halland
När Lighthouse, Gotland
Pater Noster Lighthouse, Bohuslän
Pite-Rönnskär, Västerbotten
Rataskär, Västerbotten
Revengegrundet, Södermanland
Rödkallen, Norrbotten
Sandhammaren, Skåne
Skagsudde, Ångermanland
Smygehuk Lighthouse, Skåne
Stenkyrkehuk, Gotland
Stora Fjäderägg, Ångermanland
Stora Karlsö, Gotland
Storjungfrun, Hälsingland
Storkläppen, Östergötland
Svartklubben, Uppland
Svenska Björn
Svenska Högarna, Uppland
Sydostbrotten
Söderarm, Uppland
Tistlarna, Halland
Tjärven, Uppland
Ursholmen, Bohuslän
Understen, Uppland
Utklippan, Blekinge
Vinga Lighthouse, Bohuslän
Väderöbod, Bohuslän
Örskär, Uppland
Östergarnsholm, Gotland

See also
Lighthouse
Lists of lighthouses and lightvessels
List of islands of Sweden

References

External links

 

Sweden
Lighthouses and lightvessels
Lighthouses and lightvessels